Dr. Valdis Juris Zeps (May 29, 1932 in Daugavpils, Latvia – July 25, 1996 in Riga, Latvia) was a Latvian-American linguist and college professor.

Early life and family

His parents, Jāzeps and Anna Zeps, were World War II refugees. In 1944, he fled the Soviet occupation of Latvia with his parents and brother, Aivars Zeps. They arrived first in the displaced persons camp of Lubeck, Germany, then, after receiving sponsorship, arrived in the United States in 1949.

Valdis married Betty Reel Shuford, a costume designer, in 1957. Their children are Dace, Valdis, Barbara, and William; grandchildren, Sandra, Andrew, Guntis, Monika, and Leo; great grandchild, William.

Career

Valdis studied at Miami University in Oxford, Ohio and received his doctorate in linguistics and sociology from Indiana University in Bloomington in 1961.  He became a professor of linguistics at the University of Wisconsin–Madison in 1963. He was widely published, in over 130 publications and journals, on such topics as Latvian folksong metrics, the Latvian language, and Latgalian exile literature. He wrote Ķēves dēls Kurbads (partial text at ) under the pseudonym Jānis Turbads. In 1984, he published The placenames of Latgola: A dictionary of East Latvian toponyms. 

In the 1990s, Valdis also served with distinction as a member of the Hocąk Wazijaci Language & Culture Program board in Mauston, Wisconsin, working with members of the Ho-Chunk Nation to navigate the many options for a new Hocąk language spelling system. In 1994 he compiled a large lexicon of the Hocąk language, which came to be fondly known as the "Zepsicon."

Bibliography

Articles
 Folk Meter and Latvian Verse  in Lituanus. 18:2 (1972) pg. 10–26.
 Is Slavic a West Baltic Language?   in General Linguistics. (1985) pg. 213–222..
 What’s Instant Coffee in Latvian?  in Lituanus 33:3 (1987) pg. 25–36.

Books:
 Phoneme subsystems and correspondences in Cheremis dialects, 1960
 Concordance and Thesaurus of Cheremis Poetic Language (Janua Linguarum) with Thomas A. Sebeok, 1961
 Latvian and Finnic linguistic convergences (Indiana University publication. Uralic and Altaic series), 1962
 ''The placenames of Latgola: A dictionary of East Latvian toponyms (Wisconsin Baltic studies)'.' 1984

References

1932 births
1996 deaths
Miami University alumni
Indiana University alumni
University of Wisconsin–Madison faculty
Latvian emigrants to the United States
Latgalians (modern)
Latvian World War II refugees
Writers from Daugavpils